Stecyk is a Polish-language surname. The word is a diminutive of the given name Stefan. Notable people with this surname include:

C.R. Stecyk III (born in 1950), American artist and photojournalist 
Irène Stecyk (born in 1937), Belgian writer and poet
Władysław Stecyk (born in 1951), Polish wrestler

References

Polish-language surnames